Oceanirhabdus is a Gram-positive, spore-forming, rod-shaped and peritrichous genus of bacteria from the family of Clostridiaceae with one known species (Oceanirhabdus sediminicola). Oceanirhabdus sediminicola has been isolated from sediments from the South China Sea.

References

Clostridiaceae
Bacteria genera
Monotypic bacteria genera
Taxa described in 2013